Madeleine Sandig (born 12 August 1983 in Frankfurt am Main, West Germany) is a German road and track racing cyclist.

Sandig won the under-23 individual time trial at the 2005 European Road Championships after finishing second in 2004.

Palmarès

2004
 2nd, individual time trial 2004 European Road Championships

2005
 1st, individual time trial 2005 European Road Championships
 1st, stage 4b 2005 Holland Ladies Tour
 2nd, points race, Italian national championships (track)
 3rd, time trial, Italian national championships

2006 (Buitenpoort–Flexpoint Team)
 1st, stage 1 Tour de l'Aude
 1st, points race, Italian national championships (track)
 2nd, time trial, Italian national championships

2009
 1st, stage 2 Tour de l'Aude
 1st, individual pursuit, Italian national championships (track)

2010
 3rd, individual pursuit, Italian national championships (track)
 1st, points race, Italian national championships (track)
 3rd, team pursuit, 2010 European Track Championships (track)

2011
 2nd, individual pursuit, Italian national championships (track)
 1st, team pursuit, Italian national championships (track)
 2nd, points race, Italian national championships (track)
 2nd, team pursuit, 2011 European Track Championships (track)

2012
 3rd, points race, Perth International Track Cycling Grand Prix (track)
 1st, stage 4, Czech Tour

References

External links
 
 
 

1983 births
Living people
German female cyclists
German track cyclists
Cyclists from Frankfurt
20th-century German women
21st-century German women